Itä-Savo is a Finnish language daily newspaper published in Savonlinna, Finland.

History and profile
Itä-Savo is published by Etelä-Savon Viestintä Oy, a subsidiary of Länsi-Savo Corporation, and has its headquarters in Savonlinna. The paper is published in Berliner format.

Itä-Savo had a circulation of 14,834 copies in 2013. The number of its readers was 35,000 in 2014.

References

External links
 Official website

Daily newspapers published in Finland
Finnish-language newspapers
Publications established in 1874